Talk Dirty to Me is a 1980 pornographic film written and directed by Anthony Spinelli and starring Jesie St. James, John Leslie, Richard Pacheco, Juliet Anderson, and Sharon Kane. Spinelli plays the role of "Herbie". The film is considered one of the seminal films of the latter part of the Golden Age of Porn.

The film was followed by more than a dozen sequels into the 2000s, though beyond the first five films, relevance to the original film and Leslie's character disappears. One sequel, Talk Dirty to Me Part III, is notable for featuring an early role by Traci Lords.

Premise
A self-proclaimed ladies' man brags to his somewhat dense buddy that he can seduce any woman he wants to. To prove it, he sets his sights on a beautiful blonde that they have both recently met.

Cast
 Jesie St. James as Marlene
 John Leslie as Jack
 Richard Pacheco as Lenny
 Juliet Anderson as Helen
 Sharon Kane as Rose

Reception
Talk Dirty to Me won several awards, including four AFAA Awards in the categories of "Best Film", "Best Actor" (for John Leslie), "Best Supporting Actor" (for Richard Pacheco) and "Best Editing" (for Tim McDonald). And four Critics' Adult Film Award (in the award inaugural year), in the categories of "Best Movie", "Best Director", "Best Actor" (for Leslie) and "Best Supporting Actor" (for Pacheco).

Roger Feelbert from Pornonomy gave the film a B rating.

Spin-off
Talk Dirty to Me generated a spin-off called Nothing to Hide. The film stars John Leslie and Richard Pacheco, playing their characters Jack and Lenny; it was also directed by Spinnelli.

References

External links
 

1980 films
1980s pornographic films
American pornographic films
1980s English-language films
1980s American films